Zulu is a 1964 British epic war film depicting the Battle of Rorke's Drift between the British Army and the Zulus in January 1879, during the Anglo-Zulu War. It shows how 150 British soldiers, 30 of whom were sick and wounded patients in a field hospital, successfully held off a force of 4,000 Zulu warriors.

The film was directed by American screenwriter Cy Endfield and produced by Stanley Baker and Endfield, with Joseph E. Levine as executive producer. The screenplay was by Endfield and historical writer John Prebble, based on Prebble's 1958 Lilliput article "Slaughter in the Sun". The film stars Baker and introduces Michael Caine, in his first major role, with a supporting cast that includes Jack Hawkins, Ulla Jacobsson, James Booth, Nigel Green, Paul Daneman, Glynn Edwards, Ivor Emmanuel, and Patrick Magee. Zulu chief and future South African political leader Mangosuthu Buthelezi played Zulu King Cetshwayo kaMpande, his great-grandfather. The opening and closing narration is spoken by Richard Burton.

The film was first shown on the 85th anniversary of the actual battle, 22 January 1964, at the Plaza Theatre in the West End of London. In 2017 a poll of 150 actors, directors, writers, producers, and critics for Time Out magazine  ranked it the 93rd best British film ever.

Plot
In 1879, a communiqué from Lord Chelmsford (narrated by Richard Burton) to the Secretary of State for War in London details the crushing defeat of a 1,300-man British column by the Zulu armies at Isandlwana. In the aftermath of the battle, Zulu tribesmen are shown scavenging the battlefield and collecting rifles and ammunition from the dead soldiers. At a mass Zulu marriage ceremony witnessed by missionary Otto Witt and his daughter Margareta, Zulu King Cetshwayo is informed of the great victory; Witt and Margareta flee when they realize what has happened.

A company of the British Army's 24th Regiment of Foot is using Witt's missionary station at Rorke's Drift in Natal as a supply depot and hospital for British forces in Zululand. Receiving news of Isandlwana from Natal Native Contingent Commander Adendorff and warnings that 4,000 Zulu warriors are advancing on their position, Lieutenant John Chard of the Royal Engineers assumes command of a force consisting of less than 200 men as he is slightly senior to their nominal commander, Lieutenant Gonville Bromhead. With not enough time to order a full evacuation, Chard decides to stay and fight. He has wagons, sacks of mealie (maize), and crates of hardtack stacked to form a defensive perimeter, gun holes knocked in the hospital walls, and a medical ward set up in Witt's chapel.

A contingent of South African cavalrymen who had fought at Isandlwana arrive, refuse Chard's pleas to help reinforce the station on the grounds that it is hopeless, and swiftly depart on their horses. Witt, enraged by Chard arming the hospital's patients and ordering them to fight instead of allowing them to be evacuated, persuades the Zulus serving in the Natal Native Contingent to desert. Chard then angrily orders Witt to be locked up in the chapel's supply room after Witt starts drinking heavily and proclaims that none of the soldiers will survive the coming battle.

The Zulu impis approach and then charge before quickly retreating under British fire; Adendorff explains that they are trying to find weak points in the station's defenses. Chard permits Margareta to take her father away; the Zulus, recognizing Witt, allow them to pass unharmed. Chard is concerned that the northern perimeter wall is under-defended and realises that the Zulus, aware of this, are preparing to attack the station from all sides. Zulu warriors armed with British rifles also start taking potshots at the soldiers. Throughout the day and night, wave after wave of Zulu attackers are repelled, but the defenders are slowly killed off one-by-one. The Zulus succeed in setting fire to the hospital, and Private Henry Hook rallies the patients to fight them and escape.

The next morning, the Zulus approach to within several hundred yards and sing a lament before launching again into their war chant; the British respond by singing the Welsh song "Men of Harlech". In the final assault, just as it seems the Zulus will finally overwhelm the tired defenders, the British soldiers fall back to a small redoubt in front of the chapel. With a reserve of men hidden within the redoubt, they form into three ranks and fire volley after volley, inflicting heavy casualties; the Zulus retreat. After a pause of three hours, the Zulus re-form on the Oscarberg. Resigned to another assault, the British are astonished when the Zulus instead sing a song to honour the bravery of the defenders before departing.

The film ends with another narration by Richard Burton, listing the eleven defenders who received the Victoria Cross for the defence of Rorke's Drift, the most ever awarded for a single action.

Cast

 Stanley Baker as Lieutenant John Chard, a veteran commander serving with the Royal Engineers. He takes charge of the defence of Rorke's Drift by virtue of seniority, despite his distaste for the slaughter of war
 Michael Caine as Lieutenant Gonville Bromhead, an officer who places himself under Chard's command. He is portrayed as inexperienced, arrogant, and dismissive of the Zulu army's capabilities, but slowly comes into his own by following Chard's example 
 Jack Hawkins as Reverend Otto Witt, an alcoholic Swedish missionary based at Rorke's Drift
 Ulla Jacobsson as Margareta Witt
 Chief Mangosuthu Buthelezi as King Cetshwayo, his real-life maternal great-grandfather
 James Booth as Private Henry Hook, described as "a thief, a coward, and an insubordinate barrack-room lawyer" who has been confined to the hospital after falsely claiming sickness to get excused from his duties
 Nigel Green as Colour sergeant Frank Bourne, a seasoned NCO who plays a key role in organizing and leading the British defence
 Paul Daneman as Sergeant Robert Maxfield, Private Hook's bedridden and mentally broken commanding officer. He sacrifices himself to save Hook from an enemy warrior as the hospital burns down.
 Joe Powell as Sergeant Joseph Windridge
 Ivor Emmanuel as Private Owen, a Welsh baritone and head of the company choir. At the end, Owen leads the men in singing "Men of Harlech"
 Glynn Edwards as Corporal William Allen 
 Neil McCarthy as Private Thomas, Owen's best friend who longs to return to his farm in Wales
 David Kernan as Private Frederick Hitch
 Gary Bond as Private Cole
 Peter Gill as Private 612 John Williams, a member of the company choir assigned to the squad defending the hospital.
 Richard Davies as Private 593 William Jones
 Denys Graham as Private 716 Robert Jones
 Patrick Magee as Surgeon-Major James Henry Reynolds
 Dickie Owen as Corporal Frederick Schiess, a hospitalised Swiss corporal in the Natal Native Contingent who volunteers for Chard's defenders
 Gert van den Bergh as Lieutenant Gert Adendorff, an Afrikaner officer serving with the Natal Native Contingent and a survivor of the battle at Isandlwana who advises Chard and fights alongside him
 Dennis Folbigge as Acting Assistant Commissary James Langley Dalton
 Larry Taylor as Hughes
 Kerry Jordan as Louis Byrne, the company cook who is forced to join the defenders despite his pleas of cowardice. He gets killed by a Zulu spear while carrying ammunition.
 Harvey Hall as Sick Man

Production

Cy Endfield was inspired to make the film after reading an article on the Battle of Rorke's Drift by John Prebble. He took it to actor Stanley Baker with whom he had made several films and who was interested in moving into production. Endfield and Prebble drafted a script, which Baker then showed to Joseph E. Levine while making Sodom and Gomorrah (1962) in Italy. Levine agreed to fund the movie, which was produced by Baker's company, Diamond Films. It was shot using the Super Technirama 70 cinematographic process, and distributed by Paramount Pictures in all countries excluding the United States, where it was distributed by Embassy Pictures.

Most of Zulu was shot on location in South Africa. The mission depot at Rorke's Drift was recreated beneath the natural Amphitheatre in the Drakensberg Mountains (considerably more precipitous than the real Rorke's Drift, which is little more than two small hills). The set for the British field hospital and supply depot at Rorke's Drift was created near the Tugela River with the Amphitheatre in the background. The real location of the battle was 100 kilometres (60 mi) to the northwest, on the Buffalo River near the isolated hill at Isandlwana.

Other scenes were filmed within the national parks of KwaZulu-Natal. Interiors and all the scenes starring James Booth were completed at Twickenham Film Studios in Middlesex, England. The majority of the Zulus were real Zulus. 240 Zulu extras were employed for the battle scenes, bused in from their tribal homes over 100 miles away. Around 1,000 additional tribesmen were filmed by the second unit in Zululand. Eighty South African military servicemen were cast as soldiers.

The film was compared by Baker to a Western movie, with the traditional roles of the United States Cavalry and Native Americans taken by the British and the Zulus respectively. Director Endfield showed a Western to Zulu extras to demonstrate the concept of film acting and how he wanted the warriors to conduct themselves. It has been rumoured that due to the apartheid laws in South Africa, none of the Zulu extras could be paid for their performance and that, consequently, Endfield circumvented this restriction by leaving them all the animals, primarily cattle, used in the film. This allegation is incorrect; no such law existed and all of the Zulu extras were paid in full – the main body of extras were paid the equivalent of nine shillings per day each, additional extras eight shillings, and the female dancers slightly less.

Michael Caine, who at this early stage in his career was primarily playing bit parts, was originally up for the role of Private Henry Hook, which went to James Booth. According to Caine, he was extremely nervous during his screen test for the part of Bromhead, and director Cy Endfield told him that it was the worst screen test he had ever seen, but they were casting Caine in the part anyway because the production was leaving for South Africa shortly and they had not found anyone else for the role. Caine also believed that he was fortunate that the film was directed by an American (Endfield), because "no English director would've cast me as an officer, I promise you, not one," due to his Cockney roots. Caine later said "My entire movie career is based on the length of the bar at the Prince of Wales theatre, because I was on my way out [after failing to get the part auditioned for] and it was a very long walk to the door. And I had just got there, when he called out: 'Come back!'

Caine's performance in Zulu won him praise from reviewers, and his next film role would be as the star of The Ipcress File in which he was reunited with Nigel Green.

The company was unable to obtain enough  historically authentic Martini-Henry rifles for all of the extras, and had to use additional later Lee Enfields, with a  very noticeable moving bolt on the right side, absent on the Martini-Henry. The sidearms used were also visibly later types, World War I-vintage Webley Mk VI revolvers.

The budget of the film has been the subject of some speculation. Press related figures of $3 million and even $3.5 million were mentioned upon the picture's American release. Joe Levine later revealed that Stanley Baker had approached him with a script and budget in 1962, just after the filming of Sodom and Gomorrah. Levine agreed to finance the picture up to $2 million. According to the records of the British completion bond company, Film Finance, Ltd., the production eventually finalized its budget at £666,554 (approximately, $1,720,000). This included a contingency amount of £82,241, of which only £34,563 had been used by the time the picture had all but wrapped post-production (Cost Report #15, 18 October 1963). This would have placed the near-final negative cost at £618,876 (approximately $1,600,000).

Historical accuracy

The basic premises of the film are true and largely accurate, but is not a historical re-enactment of real events.  The heavily outnumbered British successfully defended Rorke's Drift more or less as portrayed in the film. Writer Cy Endfield even consulted a Zulu tribal historian for information from Zulu oral tradition about the attack. There are, however, a number of historical inaccuracies in the film.

The regiment
The script presents the 24th Regiment of Foot as a predominantly Welsh regiment, which was not the case in 1879. Of the soldiers present at Rorke's Drift, 49 were English, 32 Welsh, 16 Irish and 22 others of indeterminate ethnicity. While the regiment had been based at Brecon in South Wales for several years, its full name at the time was 24th (2nd Warwickshire) Regiment of Foot. (In 1881, the regiment assumed its later name of South Wales Borderers.) 
The song "Men of Harlech" features prominently as the regimental song; it did not become so until later. At the time of the battle, the regimental song was "The Warwickshire Lad". There was no "battlefield singing contest" between the British and the Zulus.

The Witts
There are several inconsistencies with the historical record concerning the Swedish missionaries, the Witts. In the film, Witt is depicted as a middle-aged widower, a pacifist and drunkard, who has an adult daughter called Margareta. In reality, Otto Witt was aged 30 and had a wife, Elin, and two infant children. On the morning of the battle, Otto Witt, with the chaplain, George Smith and Surgeon-Major James Henry Reynolds had ascended Shiyane (Oscarberg), the large hill near the station, and noticed the approach of the Zulu force across the Buffalo River. Far from being a pacifist, Witt had co-operated closely with the army and negotiated a lease to put Rorke's Drift at Lord Chelmsford's disposal. Witt made it clear that he did not oppose British intervention against Cetshwayo. He had stayed at Rorke's Drift because he wished "to take part in the defence of my own house and at the same time in the defence of an important place for the whole colony, yet my thoughts went to my wife and to my children, who were at a short distance from there, and did not know anything of what was going on". He therefore left on horseback to join his family shortly before the battle.

The men of the regiment
 Lieutenants John Chard and Gonville Bromhead: Chard had received his commission in February 1868, making Bromhead the junior officer and second-in-command at the Drift even though he was an infantryman and Chard was an engineer. In the film, it is stated that Bromhead received his commission only three months after Chard when, in fact, it was a full three years after Chard.
 Surgeon Reynolds: During the Battle of Rorke's Drift, Reynolds went around the barricades, distributing ammunition and tending to the wounded there, something that is not shown in the film. During the closing voiceover, he is also incorrectly referred to as "Surgeon-Major, Army Hospital Corps"; Reynolds was of the Army Medical Department, and was not promoted to the rank of Surgeon-Major until after the action at Rorke's Drift. The pacifism apparent in Magee's portrayal is also somewhat anachronistic and not based on the historical Surgeon Reynolds.
 Private Henry Hook VC is depicted as a rogue with a penchant for alcohol; in fact he was a model soldier who later became a sergeant; he was also a teetotaller. While the film has him in the hospital "malingering, under arrest", he had actually been assigned there specifically to guard the building.
 Corporal William Allen is depicted as a model soldier; in real life he had recently been demoted from sergeant for drunkenness.
 Colour Sergeant Frank Bourne (1854–1945) is depicted as a big, hardened, middle-aged veteran; in fact, he was of modest stature and, aged 24, the youngest colour sergeant in the British Army. He was called "The Kid" by his men. Colour Sergeant Bourne would not have worn medals on his duty uniform. Moreover, Green's costume has the chevrons on the wrong arm. After the battle Bourne was offered a commission but turned it down because he lacked the money necessary to serve as a commissioned officer; he did accept a commission in 1890. He was the last British survivor of the Battle and died as a full colonel.
 The role of Padre George Smith ("Ammunition" Smith) is completely ignored.
 Corporal Christian Ferdinand Schiess was only 22, significantly younger than the actor who portrayed him. 
 The detachment of cavalry from "Durnford's Horse" who ride up to the mission station were members of the Natal Native Contingent, mainly composed of black riders rather than the local white farmers depicted in the film, who had survived the Battle of Isandlwana and had ridden to Rorke's Drift to warn and aid the garrison there. They were present during the opening action with the Zulus, but then rode off as they had very little ammunition for their cavalry carbines. Captain Stephenson is depicted at their head; in reality he was leading the NNC infantry, who had already deserted.
 The uniforms of the Natal Native Contingent are inaccurate: NNC troops were not issued with European-style clothes.  Only their European officers wore makeshift uniforms. The rank and file wore traditional tribal garb topped by a red rag worn around the forehead (as correctly depicted in the prequel Zulu Dawn). The story of their desertion is true. However, as Witt had already left, he was not responsible for their departure. They left of their own accord, with Captain Stephenson and his European NCOs. These deserters were fired at as they left and one of their NCOs, Corporal Anderson, was killed. Stephenson was later convicted of desertion at a court-martial and dismissed from the army.

The Zulus
The attack on the mission station was not ordered by King Cetshwayo, as the audience is led to believe in the film. Cetshwayo had specifically told his warriors not to invade Natal, the British Colony. The attack was led by Prince Dabulamanzi kaMpande, the King's half-brother, who pursued fleeing survivors at Isandlwana across the river and then moved on to attack Rorke's Drift. Although almost 20,000 rounds of ammunition were fired by the defenders, just under 400 Zulus were killed at Rorke's Drift. A similar number were left behind when the Zulus retreated, being too badly wounded to move. Comments from veterans many years after the event suggest the British killed many of these wounded men in the battle's aftermath, raising the total number of Zulu deaths to over 700.

Ending
At roughly 7:00 a.m., an Impi appeared prompting the British to man their positions again. No attack materialised, as the Zulus had been on the move for six days prior to the battle. In their ranks were hundreds of wounded, and moreover they were several days' march from any supplies.

Around 8:00am, another force appeared, the defenders abandoned their breakfast and took up their positions again. The approaching troops were the vanguard of Lord Chelmsford's relief column.

The Zulus did not sing a song saluting fellow warriors, and departed at the approach of the British relief column. This inaccuracy has been praised for showing the Zulus in a positive light and for treating them and the British as equals, but it has also been criticised as undermining any anti-imperial message of the film.

Reception
On its initial release in 1964, it was one of the biggest box-office hits of all time in the British market. For the next 12 years it remained in constant cinema circulation before making its first appearance on television. It then went on to become a television perennial, and remains beloved by the British public.

Zulu received highly positive reviews from critics. Bosley Crowther of The New York Times wrote that "if you're not too squeamish at the sight of slaughter and blood and can keep your mind fixed on the notion that there was something heroic and strong about British colonial expansion in the 19th century, you may find a great deal of excitement in this robustly Kiplingesque film. For certainly the fellows who made it, Cy Endfield and Stanley Baker, have done about as nifty a job of realizing on the formula as one could do." Variety praised the "intelligent screenplay" and "high allround standard of acting," concluding, "High grade technical qualities round off a classy production." Richard L. Coe of The Washington Post wrote that the film was "in the much-missed tradition of 'Beau Geste' and 'Four Feathers.' It has a restrained, leisurely tension, the heroics are splendidly stiff-upper-lip and such granite worthies as Stanley Baker and Jack Hawkins head the cast." Whitney Balliett of The New Yorker wrote that the film had "not only refurbished all the clichés of the genre but given them the sheen of high style ... It has already been pointed out that 'Zulu' is in poor taste. But so are such invaluable relics as G. A. Henty and Rider Haggard and Kipling." The Monthly Film Bulletin called Zulu "a typically fashionable war film, paying dutiful lip service to the futility of the slaughter while milking it for thrills. And the battle, which occupies the whole second half of the film, is unquestionably thrilling ... But whenever there is a pause in the action the script plunges relentlessly into bathos, with feuding officers, comic other ranks, and all the other trappings of British War Film Mark I, which one had hoped were safely obsolete."

Rotten Tomatoes gives a score of 96% based on reviews from 27 critics. The consensus summarizes: "Zulu patiently establishes a cast of colorful characters and insurmountable stakes before unleashing its white-knuckle spectacle, delivering an unforgettable war epic in the bargain."

Among more modern assessments, Robin Clifford of Reeling Reviews gave the film four out of five stars, while Brazilian reviewer Pablo Villaça of Cinema em Cena (Cinema Scene) gave the film three stars out of five. Dennis Schwartz of Ozus Movie Reviews praised Caine's performance, calling it "one of his most splendid hours on film" and graded the film 'A'.

Although actual participants of the battle are named characters in the film, they bear little resemblance to historical accuracy. The most controversial portrayal is the one of Private Hook who is depicted as a thief and malingerer (the real Hook was a model soldier and teetotaller). His elderly daughters were so disgusted with the Zulu character, they walked out of the London premiere in 1964. The fictional depiction has led to an ongoing campaign to have the historical reputation restored to the real Private Hook. The film's producers admitted they chose Hook simply because "they wanted an anti-hero who would come good under pressure".

When released in Apartheid South Africa in 1964 the film was banned for black audiences (as the government feared that its scenes of blacks killing whites might incite them to violence), apart from a few special screenings for its Zulu extras in Durban and some smaller Kwazulu towns.

By 2007 critics were divided over whether the movie should be seen as deeply anti-imperialist or as racist.

In 2018 Chief Mangosuthu Buthelezi defended the film's cultural and historical merits, stating that there's a "...deep respect that develops between the warring armies, and the nobility of King Cetshwayo's warriors as they salute the enemy, demanded a different way of thinking from the average viewer at the time of the film's release. Indeed, it remains a film that demands a thoughtful response.'

Presentation format
Zulu was filmed in Technirama and intended for presentation in Super Technirama 70, as shown on the prints. In the UK however, the only 70mm screening was a press show prior to release. While the vast majority of cinemas would have played the film in 35mm anyway, the Plaza's West End screenings were of the 35mm anamorphic version as well rather than, as might have been expected, a 70mm print. This was due to the UK's film quota regulations, which demanded that cinemas showed 30% British films during the calendar year, but the regulations only applied to 35mm presentations. By 1964, the number of British films available to a cinema like the Plaza could be limited and Zulu gave them several weeks of British quota qualification if played in 35mm. In other countries the public did get to see the film in 70mm.

Awards and honours

Ernest Archer was nominated for a BAFTA Award for Best Colour Art Direction on the film. The magazine Total Film (2004) ranked Zulu the 37th greatest British movie of all time, and it was ranked eighth in the British television programme The 100 Greatest War Films. Empire magazine ranked Zulu 351st on their list of the 500 greatest films.

Home video releases
In the US, a LaserDisc release by The Criterion Collection retains the original stereophonic soundtrack taken from a 70mm print.

An official DVD release (with a mono soundtrack as the original stereo tracks were not available) was later issued by StudioCanal through Metro-Goldwyn-Mayer. The film was released on Blu-ray in the UK in 2008; this version is region-free. On 22 January 2014, Twilight Time issued a limited-edition Blu-ray of Zulu in the US with John Barry's score as an isolated track; the release date was the 50th anniversary of the film and the 135th anniversary of the actual battle.

Merchandising
 A soundtrack album by John Barry featuring one side of the film score music and one side of "Zulu Stamp" was released on Ember Records in the UK and United Artists Records outside the Commonwealth.
 The choreographer Lionel Blair arranged a dance called the "Zulu Stamp" for Barry's instrumentals.
 A comic book by Dell Comics was released to coincide with the film that features scenes and stills not in the completed film.
 Conte toy soldiers and playsets decorated with artwork and stills from the film were produced.

In popular culture
 The Battle of Helm's Deep sequence in Peter Jackson's The Lord of the Rings: The Two Towers was filmed in a manner deliberately reminiscent of Zulu, according to Jackson's comments in supplemental material included in the special extended DVD edition of The Two Towers.
 Blood Bath at Orc's Drift is a 1985 campaign supplement for the Games Workshop Warhammer Fantasy Battle (2nd edition) game, which pitted a small force of High Elves, Dwarfs, and Humans against an attacking army of Orcs. In 1997, Games Workshop again drew inspiration from Zulu for the Massacre at Big Toof River. In this event Praetorian Guards, a faction based directly on late-19th century colonial English forces, faced off against Orc attackers, filling the role of the Zulus.
 Stanley Baker purchased John Chard's Victoria Cross in 1972 believing it to be a replica. After Baker's death, it was sold to a collector at a low price but then found to be the genuine medal.
 In many interviews, Afrika Bambaataa has said that he chose the name "Zulu" based on inspiration from the 1964 film of the same name. What Afrika Bambaataa "saw in Zulu, were powerful images of Black solidarity." This would later inspire the name for his organisation, Universal Zulu Nation, in the 1970s.

Gallery

See also

 BFI Top 100 British films (1999)
 Cape Colonial Forces
 Colony of Natal
 Sir Henry Bartle Edward Frere, 1st Baronet
 Henry Herbert, 4th Earl of Carnarvon
 History of Cape Colony from 1870 to 1899
 Kaffir (Historical usage in southern Africa)
 British Kaffraria
 Kingdom of Zulu
 Kaffraria
 List of conflicts in Africa
 Martini-Henry
 Military history of South Africa
 Scramble for Africa
 Shaka Zulu (TV series)
 Xhosa Wars (also known as the Cape Frontier Wars or "Africa's 100 Years War")
 Zulu War

References

Bibliography

External links

 
 
 
 Long review with appendices at James Booth fansite

1964 films
1960s historical adventure films
1964 war films
British Empire war films
British historical adventure films
British war epic films
1960s English-language films
Epic films based on actual events
Films scored by John Barry (composer)
Films about the British Army
Films adapted into comics
Films directed by Cy Endfield
Films set in 1879
Films set in South Africa
Films set in the British Empire
Films shot in South Africa
Siege films
War films based on actual events
Works about the Anglo-Zulu War
Zulu-language films
Embassy Pictures films
Censored films
1960s British films